Mount Kami ( = Kami Yama, meaning "a god mountain") is the highest peak, with an elevation of 1,438 meters, of Mount Hakone, in Hakone, Kanagawa, Japan. Worshipping Mount Hakone with this highest peak is recorded in a 12th century document, as having started at the time of the legendary Emperor Kōshō (475 BC to 393 BC).

Climbing Mount Kami
Climbing mountains is a popular sport in the Mount Hakone area. To the top of Mount Kami, it takes about one hour fifteen minutes from Mount Koma Summit Station of the Hakone Komagatake Ropeway (one hour twenty minutes, on return), or one hour twenty minutes from Ōwakudani Station of the Hakone Ropeway (one hour, on return).   The top of Mount Kami is covered with tall trees, which prevent a nice view of its surroundings
.

See also
Fuji-Hakone-Izu National Park

References

External link

Mountains of Kanagawa Prefecture
Hakone, Kanagawa